The 2006 Los Angeles Angels of Anaheim season started with the team trying to win their 3rd consecutive AL West title. However, they came up short, finishing in second place with a record of 89–73. But the biggest story of the year was longtime Angels mainstay Tim Salmon playing his final season.  Towards the end of the season, not only were the fans excited with trying to get into the playoffs in the final month of the season, but they were excited about Salmon trying to hit his 300th home run.  Eventually, he ended with 299, one short of the milestone.

Regular season

Season standings

Record vs. opponents

Roster

Game log

! Stadium
! width="50px" | Boxscore
! width="42px" | GB
|- bgcolor="#bbffbb"
| 1 || April 3 || @ Mariners || 5–4 || Shields (1–0) || Sherrill (0–1) || Rodríguez (1) || 45,515 || 1–0 || Safeco Field || || bgcolor="bbffbb" | +1
|- bgcolor="#ffbbbb"
| 2 || April 4 || @ Mariners || 10–8 || Piñeiro (1–0) || Lackey (0–1) || || 20,051 || 1–1 || Safeco Field || || bgcolor="f2f2f2" | 0
|- bgcolor="#ffbbbb"
| 3 || April 5 || @ Mariners || 6–4 || Washburn (1–0) || Jeff Weaver (0–1) || Sherrill (1) || 21,394 || 1–2 || Safeco Field || || bgcolor="ffbbbb" | -1
|- bgcolor="#bbffbb"
| 4 || April 7 || Yankees || 4–1 || Escobar (1–0) || Chacón (0–1) || Rodríguez (2) || 44,221 || 2–2 || Angel Stadium of Anaheim || || bgcolor="ffbbbb" | -
|- bgcolor="#bbffbb"
| 5 || April 8 || Yankees || 3–2 || Santana (1–0) || Johnson (1–1) || Rodríguez (3) || 44,044 || 3–2 || Angel Stadium of Anaheim || || bgcolor="ffbbbb" | -
|- bgcolor="#ffbbbb"
| 6 || April 9 || Yankees || 10–1 || Mussina (1–0) || Colón (0–1) || || 44,020 || 3–3 || Angel Stadium of Anaheim || || bgcolor="ffbbbb" | -1
|- bgcolor="#bbffbb"
| 7 || April 10 || Rangers || 5–2 || Lackey (1–1) || Loe (0–2) || Rodríguez (4) || 38,003 || 4–3 || Angel Stadium of Anaheim || || bgcolor="ffbbbb" | -1
|- bgcolor="#bbffbb"
| 8 || April 11 || Rangers || 5–4 || Romero (1–0) || Cordero (0–1) || || 40,012 || 5–3 || Angel Stadium of Anaheim || || bgcolor="f2f2f2" | 0
|- bgcolor="#ffbbbb"
| 9 || April 12 || Rangers || 11–3 || Koronka (1–1) || Escobar (1–1) || || 42,911 || 5–4 || Angel Stadium of Anaheim || || bgcolor="f2f2f2" | 0
|- bgcolor="#ffbbbb"
| 10 || April 14 || @ Orioles || 6–5 || Byrdak (1–0) || Shields (1–1) ||  || 25,415 || 5–5 || Oriole Park at Camden Yards || || bgcolor="bbffbb" | +
|- bgcolor="#ffbbbb"
| 11 || April 15 || @ Orioles || 3–2 || Bédard (3–0) || Colón (0–2) || Ray (4) || 24,497 || 5–6 || Oriole Park at Camden Yards || || bgcolor="ffbbbb" | -
|- bgcolor="#bbffbb"
| 12 || April 16 || @ Orioles || 9–3 || Lackey (2–1) || Benson (1–2) || || 19,904 || 6–6 || Oriole Park at Camden Yards || || bgcolor="bbffbb" | +
|- bgcolor="#ffbbbb"
| 13 || April 17 || @ Orioles || 4–2 || Cabrera (1–1) || Jeff Weaver (0–2) ||Ray (5) || 15,691 || 6–7 || Oriole Park at Camden Yards || || bgcolor="f2f2f2" | 0
|- bgcolor="#bbffbb"
| 14 || April 18 || @ Twins || 8–2 || Escobar (2–1) || Silva (1–2) || Shields (1) || 15,787 || 7–7 || HHH Metrodome || || bgcolor="f2f2f2" | 0
|- bgcolor="#ffbbbb"
| 15 || April 19  || @ Twins || 12–10  || Nathan (1–0) || Romero (1–1) || || 21,507 || 7–8 || HHH Metrodome || || bgcolor="f2f2f2" | 0
|- bgcolor="#bbffbb"
| 16 || April 20 || @ Twins || 6–4 || Gregg (1–0) || Crain (0–1) || Rodríguez (5) || 12,990 || 8–8 || HHH Metrodome || || bgcolor="bbffbb" | +1
|- bgcolor="#ffbbbb"
| 17 || April 21 || @ Athletics || 5–3 || Harden (3–0) || Romero (1–2) || Calero (1) || 19,874 || 8–9 || McAfee Coliseum || || bgcolor="f2f2f2" | 0
|- bgcolor="#bbffbb"
| 18 || April 22 || @ Athletics || 5–4 || Jeff Weaver (1–2) || Haren (0–2) || Rodríguez (6) || 22,670 || 9–9 || McAfee Coliseum || || bgcolor="f2f2f2" | 0
|- bgcolor="#bbffbb"
| 19 || April 23 || @ Athletics || 4–3 || Escobar (3–1) || Loaiza (0–3) || Rodríguez (7) || 27,104 || 10–9 || McAfee Coliseum || || bgcolor="f2f2f2" | 0
|- bgcolor="#bbffbb"
| 20 || April 24 || Tigers || 3–0 || Santana (2–0) || Rogers (3–2) || Rodríguez (8) || 39,776 || 11–9 || Angel Stadium of Anaheim || || bgcolor="bbffbb" | +1
|- bgcolor="#ffbbbb"
| 21 || April 25 || Tigers || 5–2 || Bonderman (2–2) || Carrasco (0–1) || Jones (3) || 40,007 || 11–10 || Angel Stadium of Anaheim || || bgcolor="f2f2f2" | 0
|- bgcolor="#bbffbb"
| 22 || April 26 || Tigers || 4–0 || Lackey (3–1) || Maroth (3–1) || || 37,532 || 12–10 || Angel Stadium of Anaheim || || bgcolor="bbffbb" | +1
|- bgcolor="#ffbbbb"
| 23 || April 28 || White Sox || 8–5 || García (4–1) || Jeff Weaver (1–3) || || 43,940 || 12–11 || Angel Stadium of Anaheim || || bgcolor="bbffbb" | +1
|- bgcolor="#ffbbbb"
| 24 || April 29 || White Sox || 2–1 || Contreras (4–0) || Escobar (3–2) || Jenks (7) || 44,065 || 12–12 || Angel Stadium of Anaheim || || bgcolor="f2f2f2" | 0
|- bgcolor="#ffbbbb"
| 25 || April 30 || White Sox || 6–5 || Politte (1–1) || Shields (1–2) || Cotts (1) || 44,135 || 12–13 || Angel Stadium of Anaheim || || bgcolor="ffbbbb" | -1

! Stadium
! width="50px" | Boxscore
! width="42px" | GB
|- bgcolor="#ffbbbb"
| 26 || May 1 || Athletics || 1–0 || Zito  (2–2) ||  Carrasco (0–2) || Duchscherer (2) || 41,721 || 12–14 || Angel Stadium of Anaheim || || bgcolor="ffbbbb" | -2
|- bgcolor="#ffbbbb"
| 27 || May 2 || Athletics || 10–3 || Halsey (1–0) || Lackey (3–2) ||  || 35,943 || 12–15 || Angel Stadium of Anaheim || || bgcolor="ffbbbb" | -3
|- bgcolor="#ffbbbb"
| 28 || May 3 || @ Tigers || 2–1 || Zumaya (1–0) || Jeff Weaver (1–4) || Rodney (5) || 17,171 || 12–16 || Comerica Park || || bgcolor="ffbbbb" | -4
|- bgcolor="#bbffbb"
| 29 || May 4 || @ Tigers || 7–2 || Gregg (2–0) || Verlander (3–3) ||  || 24,879 || 13–16 || Comerica Park || || bgcolor="ffbbbb" | -4
|- bgcolor="#ffbbbb"
| 30 || May 5 || @ Blue Jays || 13–3 || Chacín (5–1) || Santana (2–1) ||  || 22,227 || 13–17 || Rogers Centre || || bgcolor="ffbbbb" | -4
|- bgcolor="#bbffbb"
| 31 || May 6 || @ Blue Jays || 3–0 || Escobar (4–2) || Lilly (3–2) || Rodríguez (9) || 29,761 || 14–17 || Rogers Centre || || bgcolor="ffbbbb" | -3
|- bgcolor="#ffbbbb"
| 32 || May 7 || @ Blue Jays || 3–1 || Janssen (1–2) || Lackey (3–3) || Ryan (7) || 24,351 || 14–18 || Rogers Centre || || bgcolor="ffbbbb" | -3
|- bgcolor="#ffbbbb"
| 33 || May 8 || @ Blue Jays || 5–1 || Halladay  (4–1) || Jeff Weaver (1–5) ||  || 18,611 || 14–19 || Rogers Centre || || bgcolor="ffbbbb" | -4
|- bgcolor="#ffbbbb"
| 34 || May 9 || @ White Sox || 9–1 || García (5–1) || Gregg (2–1) ||  || 36,539 || 14–20 || U.S. Cellular Field || || bgcolor="ffbbbb" | -4
|- bgcolor="#bbffbb"
| 35 || May 10 || @ White Sox || 12–5 || Santana (3–1) || Haeger (0–1) || Rodríguez (10) || 31,034 || 15–20 || U.S. Cellular Field || ||  bgcolor="ffbbbb" | -3
|- bgcolor="bbbbbb"
| || May 11 || @ White Sox || colspan=4 |Postponed (rain); Rescheduled for August 7 ||  || 15–20 || U.S. Cellular Field || ||  bgcolor="ffbbbb" | -3
|- bgcolor="#bbffbb"
| 36 || May 12 || Mariners || 12–7 || Escobar (5–2) || Piñeiro (4–3) || Carrasco (1) || 43,912 || 16–20 || Angel Stadium of Anaheim || || bgcolor="ffbbbb" | -4
|- bgcolor="#ffbbbb"
| 37 || May 13 || Mariners || 5–4  || Sherrill (1–1) || Gregg (2–2) || Woods (1) || 43,821 || 16–21 || Angel Stadium of Anaheim || || bgcolor="ffbbbb" | -3
|- bgcolor="#ffbbbb"
| 38 || May 14 || Mariners || 9–4 || Meche (3–2) || Jeff Weaver (1–6) || Fruto (1) || 43,191 || 16–22 || Angel Stadium of Anaheim || || bgcolor="ffbbbb" | -4
|- bgcolor="#bbffbb"
| 39 || May 16 || Blue Jays || 8–3 || Santana (4–1) || Lilly (4–3) ||  || 43,066 || 17–22 || Angel Stadium of Anaheim || || bgcolor="ffbbbb" | -3
|- bgcolor="#ffbbbb"
| 40 || May 17 || Blue Jays || 3–0 || Janssen  (2–3) || Escobar (5–3) || Ryan (9) || 39,767 || 17–23 || Angel Stadium of Anaheim || || bgcolor="ffbbbb" | -3
|- bgcolor="#ffbbbb"
| 41 || May 18 || Blue Jays || 8–4 || Frasor (1–0) || Rodríguez (0–1) ||  || 37,850 || 17–24 || Angel Stadium of Anaheim || || bgcolor="ffbbbb" | -4
|- bgcolor="#ffbbbb"
| 42 || May 19 || @ Dodgers || 16–3 || Sele (2–0) || Jeff Weaver (1–7) ||  || 55,655 || 17–25 || Dodger Stadium || || bgcolor="ffbbbb" | -5
|- bgcolor="#ffbbbb"
| 43 || May 20 || @ Dodgers || 8–4 || Beimel (1–0) || Shields (1–3) ||  || 55,587 || 17–26 || Dodger Stadium || || bgcolor="ffbbbb" | -5
|- bgcolor="#ffbbbb"
| 44 || May 21 || @ Dodgers || 7–0 || Lowe (2–3) || Santana (4–2) ||  || 55,662 || 17–27 || Dodger Stadium || || bgcolor="ffbbbb" | -5
|- bgcolor="#ffbbbb"
| 45 || May 22 || @ Rangers || 3–2 || Loe (3–4) || Escobar (5–4) || Otsuka (6) || 22,032 || 17–28 || Ameriquest Field in Arlington || || bgcolor="ffbbbb" | -6
|- bgcolor="#bbffbb"
| 46 || May 23 || @ Rangers || 7–6 || Carrasco (1–2) || Cordero (3–3) || Rodríguez (11) || 21,859 || 18–28 || Ameriquest Field in Arlington || || bgcolor="ffbbbb" | -5
|- bgcolor="#bbffbb"
| 47 || May 24 || @ Rangers || 8–5 || Jeff Weaver (2–7) || Tejada (1–2) ||  || 16,512 || 19–28 || Ameriquest Field in Arlington || || bgcolor="ffbbbb" | -4
|- bgcolor="#bbffbb"
| 48 || May 26 || Orioles || 5–2 || Shields (2–3) || Williams (1–2) || Rodríguez (12) || 42,675 || 20–28 || Angel Stadium of Anaheim || || bgcolor="ffbbbb" | -5
|- bgcolor="#bbffbb"
| 49 || May 27 || Orioles || 10–1 || Jered Weaver (1–0) || Bédard (5–4) ||  || 43,005 || 21–28 || Angel Stadium of Anaheim || || bgcolor="ffbbbb" | -4
|- bgcolor="#ffbbbb"
| 50 || May 28 || Orioles || 7–6 || Birkins (1–0) || Escobar (5–5) || Ray (13) || 40,856 || 21–29 || Angel Stadium of Anaheim || || bgcolor="ffbbbb" | -5
|- bgcolor="#bbffbb"
| 51 || May 29 || Twins || 4–3 || Shields (3–3) || Crain (0–3) ||  || 40,007 || 22–29 || Angel Stadium of Anaheim || || bgcolor="ffbbbb" | -5
|- bgcolor="#bbffbb"
| 52 || May 30 || Twins || 6–3 || Jeff Weaver (3–7) || Baker (2–5) || Rodríguez (13) || 37,299 || 23–29 || Angel Stadium of Anaheim || || bgcolor="ffbbbb" | -5
|- bgcolor="#ffbbbb"
| 53 || May 31 || Twins || 7–1 || Liriano  (4–0) || Santana (4–3) ||  || 40,001 || 23–30 || Angel Stadium of Anaheim || || bgcolor="ffbbbb" | -5

! Stadium
! width="50px" | Boxscore
! width="42px" | GB
|- bgcolor="#bbffbb"
| 54 || June 2 || @ Indians || 10–3 || Jered Weaver (2–0) || Johnson (3–5) ||  || 22,957 || 24–30 || Jacobs Field || || bgcolor="ffbbbb" | -5
|- bgcolor="#ffbbbb"
| 55 || June 3 || @ Indians || 14–2 || Lee (4–5) || Escobar (5–6) ||  || 23,769 || 24–31 || Jacobs Field || || bgcolor="ffbbbb" | -5
|- bgcolor="#bbffbb"
| 56 || June 4 || @ Indians || 14–2 || Lackey (4–3) || Sabathia (5–2) ||  || 19,128 || 25–31 || Jacobs Field || || bgcolor="ffbbbb" | -6
|- bgcolor="#ffbbbb"
| 57 || June 5 || @ Devil Rays || 4–0 || Shields (1–0) || Jeff Weaver (3–8) || Walker (10) || 9,519 || 25–32 || Tropicana Field || || bgcolor="ffbbbb" | -5
|- bgcolor="#bbffbb"
| 58 || June 6 || @ Devil Rays || 12–2 || Santana (5–3) || Kazmir (7–4) ||  || 13,762 || 26–32 || Tropicana Field || || bgcolor="ffbbbb" | -5
|- bgcolor="#bbffbb"
| 59 || June 7 || @ Devil Rays || 6–2 || Jered Weaver (3–0) || McClung (2–8) ||  || 9,517 || 27–32 || Tropicana Field || || bgcolor="ffbbbb" | -5
|- bgcolor="#ffbbbb"
| 60 || June 9 || Mariners || 4–1 || Washburn (4–7) || Escobar (5–7) || Putz (10) || 44,114 || 27–33 || Angel Stadium of Anaheim || || bgcolor="ffbbbb" | -5
|- bgcolor="#ffbbbb"
| 61 || June 10 || Mariners || 12–6 || Meche (6–4) || Lackey (4–4) ||  || 44,129 || 27–34 || Angel Stadium of Anaheim || || bgcolor="ffbbbb" | -6
|- bgcolor="#ffbbbb"
| 62 || June 11 || Mariners || 6–2 || Hernández (6–6) || Jeff Weaver (3–9) ||  || 42,198 || 27–35 || Angel Stadium of Anaheim || || bgcolor="ffbbbb" | -6
|- bgcolor="#bbffbb"
| 63 || June 12 || Royals || 4–3 || Santana (6–3) || Keppel (0–2) || Rodríguez (14) || 36,146 || 28–35 || Angel Stadium of Anaheim || || bgcolor="ffbbbb" | -5
|- bgcolor="#bbffbb"
| 64 || June 13 || Royals || 4–1 || Jered Weaver (4–0) || Duckworth (0–1) || Rodríguez (15) || 38,820 || 29–35 || Angel Stadium of Anaheim || || bgcolor="ffbbbb" | -4
|- bgcolor="#ffbbbb"
| 65 || June 14 || Royals || 4–3 || Redman (3–4) || Shields (3–4) || Burgos (9) || 38,910 || 29–36 || Angel Stadium of Anaheim || || bgcolor="ffbbbb" | -5
|- bgcolor="#bbffbb"
| 66 || June 15 || Royals || 3–2 || Carrasco (2–2) || Dessens (3–6) ||  || 41,649 || 30–36 || Angel Stadium of Anaheim || || bgcolor="ffbbbb" | -5
|- bgcolor="#ffbbbb"
| 67 || June 16 || Padres || 5–4 || Embree (2–0) || Rodríguez (0–2) || Hoffman (16) || 44,005 || 30–37 || Angel Stadium of Anaheim || || bgcolor="ffbbbb" | -6
|- bgcolor="#bbffbb"
| 68 || June 17 || Padres || 3–2 || Santana (7–3) || Peavy (4–8) ||  Rodríguez (16) || 43,909 || 31–37 || Angel Stadium of Anaheim || || bgcolor="ffbbbb" | -6
|- bgcolor="#ffbbbb"
| 69 || June 18 || Padres || 7–3 || Park (5–3) || Colón (0–3) ||  || 44,159 || 31–38 || Angel Stadium of Anaheim || || bgcolor="ffbbbb" | -7
|- bgcolor="#ffbbbb"
| 70 || June 19 || @ Giants || 2–1 || Cain (6–5) || Escobar (5–8) || Benítez (5) || 39,594 || 31–39 || AT&T Park || || bgcolor="ffbbbb" | -7
|- bgcolor="#ffbbbb"
| 71 || June 20 || @ Giants || 3–2 || Morris (5–7) || Lackey (4–5) || Benítez (6) || 40,887 || 31–40 || AT&T Park || || bgcolor="ffbbbb" | -7
|- bgcolor="#bbffbb"
| 72 || June 21 || @ Giants || 6–3 || Shields (4–4) || Accardo (0–1) || Rodríguez (17) || 40,900 || 32–40 || AT&T Park || || bgcolor="ffbbbb" | -7
|- bgcolor="#bbffbb"
| 73 || June 23 || @ Diamondbacks || 8–2 || Santana (8–3) || González (2–1) ||  || 23,682 || 33–40 || Chase Field || || bgcolor="ffbbbb" | -7
|- bgcolor="#bbffbb"
| 74 || June 24 || @ Diamondbacks || 6–4 || Donnelly (1–0) || Medders (1–2) || Rodríguez (18) || 33,514 || 34–40 || Chase Field || || bgcolor="ffbbbb" | -6
|- bgcolor="#ffbbbb"
| 75 || June 25 || @ Diamondbacks || 9–7 || Batista (7–5) || Escobar (5–9) || Julio (6) || 24,788 || 34–41 || Chase Field || || bgcolor="ffbbbb" | -7
|- bgcolor="#bbffbb"
| 76 || June 26 || Rockies || 5–4 || Lackey (5–5) || Mesa (0–2) || Rodríguez (19) || 43,781 || 35–41 || Angel Stadium of Anaheim || || bgcolor="ffbbbb" | -6
|- bgcolor="#ffbbbb"
| 77 || June 27 || Rockies || 12–4 || Cook (6–7) || Jeff Weaver (3–10) ||  || 39,341 || 35–42 || Angel Stadium of Anaheim || || bgcolor="ffbbbb" | -6
|- bgcolor="#ffbbbb"
| 78 || June 28 || Rockies || 6–2 || Ramírez (3–1) || Shields (4–5) ||  || 38,153 || 35–43 || Angel Stadium of Anaheim || || bgcolor="ffbbbb" | -6
|- bgcolor="#ffbbbb"
| 79 || June 30 || Dodgers || 6–1 || Penny (9–2) || Colón (0–4) ||  || 44,233 || 35–44 || Angel Stadium of Anaheim || || bgcolor="ffbbbb" | -7

! Stadium
! width="50px" | Boxscore
! width="42px" | GB
|- bgcolor="#bbffbb"
| 80 || July 1 || Dodgers || 9–2 || Escobar (6–9) || Hendrickson (4–9) ||  || 43,891 || 36–44 || Angel Stadium of Anaheim || || bgcolor="ffbbbb" | -6
|- bgcolor="#bbffbb"
| 81 || July 2 || Dodgers || 4–0 || Lackey (6–5) || Billingsley (0–2) ||  || 44,223 || 37–44 || Angel Stadium of Anaheim || || bgcolor="ffbbbb" | -5
|- bgcolor="#bbffbb"
| 82 || July 3 || @ Mariners || 7–1 || Jered Weaver (5–0) || Hernández (8–8) ||  || 30,641 || 38–44 || Safeco Field || || bgcolor="ffbbbb" | -5
|- bgcolor="#bbffbb"
| 83 || July 4 || @ Mariners || 14–6 || Santana (9–3) || Mateo (5–3) ||  || 30,857 || 39–44 || Safeco Field || || bgcolor="ffbbbb" | -5
|- bgcolor="#bbffbb"
| 84 || July 5 || @ Mariners || 4–0 || Colón (1–4) || Moyer (5–8) ||  || 25,008 || 40–44 || Safeco Field || || bgcolor="ffbbbb" | -4
|- bgcolor="#ffbbbb"
| 85 || July 6 || @ Athletics || 5–7 || Street (2–3) || Shields (4–6) ||  || 14,673 || 40–45 || McAfee Coliseum || || bgcolor="ffbbbb" | -5
|- bgcolor="#bbffbb"
| 86 || July 7 || @ Athletics || 3–0 || Lackey (7–5) || Zito (8–6) ||  || 20,711 || 41–45 || McAfee Coliseum || || bgcolor="ffbbbb" | -4
|- bgcolor="#bbffbb"
| 87 || July 8 || @ Athletics || 6–4 || Jered Weaver (6–0) || Blanton (8–8) || Rodríguez (20) || 25,289 || 42–45 || McAfee Coliseum || || bgcolor="ffbbbb" | -3
|- bgcolor="#bbffbb"
| 88 || July 9 || @ Athletics || 4–2 || Santana (10–3) || Haren (6–7) || Rodríguez (21) || 26,603 || 43–45 || McAfee Coliseum || || bgcolor="ffbbbb" | -2
|- bgcolor="bbcaff"
|colspan=4 bgcolor="#bbcaff"| July 11: All-Star Game  || Ryan  || Hoffman  || Rivera  || 38,904 ||  || PNC Park || colspan=2 |  Pittsburgh, PA
|- bgcolor="#bbffbb"
| 89 || July 14 || Devil Rays || 4–0 || Lackey (8–5) || Seo (2–7) ||  || 44,026 || 44–45 || Angel Stadium of Anaheim || || bgcolor="ffbbbb" | -2
|- bgcolor="#bbffbb"
| 90 || July 15 || Devil Rays || 9–2 || Santana (11–3) || Shields (4–3) ||  || 44,125 || 45–45 || Angel Stadium of Anaheim || ||  bgcolor="ffbbbb" | -1
|- bgcolor="#bbffbb"
| 91 || July 16 || Devil Rays || 7–5 || Shields (5–6) || Harville (0–2) || Rodríguez (22) || 41,646 || 46–45 || Angel Stadium of Anaheim || || bgcolor="ffbbbb" | -1
|- bgcolor="#bbffbb"
| 92 || July 17 || Indians || 10–5 || Moseley (1–0) || Westbrook (7–5) ||  || 43,921 || 47–45 || Angel Stadium of Anaheim || || bgcolor="ffbbbb" | -
|- bgcolor="#bbffbb"
| 93 || July 18 || Indians || 7–5 || Saunders (1–0) || Lee (9–7) || Rodríguez (23) || 44,020 || 48–45 || Angel Stadium of Anaheim || || bgcolor="ffbbbb" | -
|- bgcolor="#ffbbbb"
| 94 || July 19 || Indians || 6–4 || Byrd (7–6) || Lackey (8–6) || Wickman (15) || 43,744 || 48–46 || Angel Stadium of Anaheim || || bgcolor="ffbbbb" | -1
|- bgcolor="#ffbbbb"
| 95 || July 20 || @ Royals || 9–4 || Dessens (5–7) || Gregg (2–3) ||  || 12,178 || 48–47 || Kauffman Stadium || || bgcolor="ffbbbb" | -2
|- bgcolor="#ffbbbb"
| 96 || July 21 || @ Royals || 8–3 || Hernández (2–4) || Colón (1–5) ||  || 20,988 || 48–48 || Kauffman Stadium || || bgcolor="ffbbbb" | -2
|- bgcolor="#bbffbb"
| 97 || July 22 || @ Royals || 4–3 || Shields (6–6) || Wellemeyer (0–3) || Rodríguez (24) || 26,873 || 49–48 || Kauffman Stadium || || bgcolor="ffbbbb" | -2
|- bgcolor="#bbffbb"
| 98 || July 23 || @ Royals || 3–1 || Jered Weaver (7–0) || Duckworth (1–4) || Rodríguez (25) || 17,496 || 50–48 || Kauffman Stadium || || bgcolor="ffbbbb" | -1
|- bgcolor="#bbffbb"
| 99 || July 24 || @ Devil Rays || 8–4 || Lackey (9–6) || Seo (2–9) ||  || 11,020 || 51–48 || Tropicana Field || || bgcolor="f2f2f2" | 0
|- bgcolor="#ffbbbb"
| 100 || July 25 || @ Devil Rays || 6–3 || Switzer (2–1) || Santana (11–4) ||  || 11,253 || 51–49 || Tropicana Field || || bgcolor="f2f2f2" | 0
|- bgcolor="#bbffbb"
| 101 || July 26 || @ Devil Rays || 15–6 || Gregg (3–3) || Fossum (4–4) ||  || 18,525 || 52–49 || Tropicana Field || || bgcolor="f2f2f2" | 0
|- bgcolor="#bbffbb"
| 102 || July 28 || @ Red Sox || 8–3 || Escobar (7–9) || Lester (5–1) ||  || 36,109 || 53–49 || Fenway Park || || bgcolor="bbffbb" | +
|- bgcolor="#ffbbbb"
| 103 || July 29 || @ Red Sox || 7–6 || Tavárez (2–3) || Carrasco (2–3) ||  || 35,621 || 53–50 || Fenway Park || || bgcolor="ffbbbb" | -
|- bgcolor="#bbffbb"
| 104 || July 30 || @ Red Sox || 10–4 || Lackey (10–6) || Schilling (13–4) ||  || 36,048 || 54–50 || Fenway Park || || bgcolor="ffbbbb" | -
|- bgcolor="#ffbbbb"
| 105 || July 31 || Athletics || 3–1 || Haren (8–9) || Santana (11–5) ||  || 43,558 || 54–51 || Angel Stadium of Anaheim || || bgcolor="ffbbbb" | -1
|-

! Stadium
! width="50px" | Boxscore
! width="42px" | GB
|- bgcolor="#bbffbb"
| 106 || August 1 || Athletics || – ||  (–) ||  (–) ||  ||  || 55–51 || Angel Stadium of Anaheim || || bgcolor="ffbbbb" | -
|- bgcolor="#ffbbbb"
| 107 || August 2 || Athletics || – ||  (–) ||  (–) ||  ||  || 55–52 || Angel Stadium of Anaheim || || bgcolor="ffbbbb" | -1
|- bgcolor="#ffbbbb"
| 108 || August 3 || Rangers || – ||  (–) ||  (–) ||  ||  || 55–53 || Angel Stadium of Anaheim || || bgcolor="ffbbbb" | -2
|- bgcolor="#ffbbbb"
| 109 || August 4 || Rangers || – ||  (–) ||  (–) ||  ||  || 55–54 || Angel Stadium of Anaheim || || bgcolor="ffbbbb" | -3
|- bgcolor="#bbffbb"
| 110 || August 5 || Rangers || – ||  (–) ||  (–) ||  ||  || 56–54 || Angel Stadium of Anaheim || || bgcolor="ffbbbb" | -3
|- bgcolor="#bbffbb"
| 111 || August 6 || Rangers || – ||  (–) ||  (–) ||  ||  || 57–54 || Angel Stadium of Anaheim || || bgcolor="ffbbbb" | -3
|- bgcolor="#bbffbb"
| 112 || August 7 || @ White Sox || – ||  (–) ||  (–) ||  ||  || 58–54 || U.S. Cellular Field || || bgcolor="ffbbbb" | -3
|- bgcolor="#bbffbb"
| 113 || August 8 || @ Indians || – ||  (–) ||  (–) ||  ||  || 59–54 || Jacobs Field || || bgcolor="ffbbbb" | -3
|- bgcolor="#ffbbbb"
| 114 || August 9 || @ Indians || – ||  (–) ||  (–) ||  ||  || 59–55 || Jacobs Field || || bgcolor="ffbbbb" | -3
|- bgcolor="#ffbbbb"
| 115 || August 10 || @ Indians || – ||  (–) ||  (–) ||  ||  || 59–56 || Jacobs Field || || bgcolor="ffbbbb" | -3
|- bgcolor="#bbffbb"
| 116 || August 11 || @ Yankees || – ||  (–) ||  (–) ||  ||  || 60–56 || Yankee Stadium || || bgcolor="ffbbbb" | -3
|- bgcolor="#ffbbbb"
| 117 || August 12 || @ Yankees || – ||  (–) ||  (–) ||  ||  || 60–57 || Yankee Stadium || || bgcolor="ffbbbb" | -4
|- bgcolor="#bbffbb"
| 118 || August 13 || @ Yankees || – ||  (–) ||  (–) ||  ||  || 61–57 || Yankee Stadium || || bgcolor="ffbbbb" | -4
|- bgcolor="#ffbbbb"
| 119 || August 14 || @ Yankees || – ||  (–) ||  (–) ||  ||  || 61–58 || Yankee Stadium || || bgcolor="ffbbbb" | -5
|- bgcolor="#bbffbb"
| 120 || August 15 || @ Rangers || – ||  (–) ||  (–) ||  ||  || 62–58 || Ameriquest Field in Arlington || || bgcolor="ffbbbb" | -5
|- bgcolor="#ffbbbb"
| 121 || August 16 || @ Rangers || – ||  (–) ||  (–) ||  ||  || 62–59 || Ameriquest Field in Arlington || || bgcolor="ffbbbb" | -6
|- bgcolor="#bbffbb"
| 122 || August 17 || Mariners || – ||  (–) ||  (–) ||  ||  || 63–59 || Angel Stadium of Anaheim || || bgcolor="ffbbbb" | -6
|- bgcolor="#bbffbb"
| 123 || August 18 || Mariners || – ||  (–) ||  (–) ||  ||  || 64–59 || Angel Stadium of Anaheim || || bgcolor="ffbbbb" | -4
|- bgcolor="#bbffbb"
| 124 || August 19 || Mariners || – ||  (–) ||  (–) ||  ||  || 65–59 || Angel Stadium of Anaheim || || bgcolor="ffbbbb" | -4
|- bgcolor="#bbffbb"
| 125 || August 20 || Mariners || – ||  (–) ||  (–) ||  ||  || 66–59 || Angel Stadium of Anaheim || || bgcolor="ffbbbb" | -4
|- bgcolor="#bbffbb"
| 126 || August 22 || Red Sox || – ||  (–) ||  (–) ||  ||  || 67–59 || Angel Stadium of Anaheim || || bgcolor="ffbbbb" | -4
|- bgcolor="#ffbbbb"
| 127 || August 23 || Red Sox || – ||  (–) ||  (–) ||  ||  || 67–60 || Angel Stadium of Anaheim || || bgcolor="ffbbbb" | -5
|- bgcolor="#ffbbbb"
| 128 || August 24 || Red Sox || – ||  (–) ||  (–) ||  ||  || 67–61 || Angel Stadium of Anaheim || || bgcolor="ffbbbb" | -5
|- bgcolor="#bbffbb"
| 129 || August 25 || Yankees || – ||  (–) ||  (–) ||  ||  || 68–61 || Angel Stadium of Anaheim || || bgcolor="ffbbbb" | -5
|- bgcolor="#bbffbb"
| 130 || August 26 || Yankees || – ||  (–) ||  (–) ||  ||  || 69–61 || Angel Stadium of Anaheim || || bgcolor="ffbbbb" | -5
|- bgcolor="#ffbbbb"
| 131 || August 27 || Yankees || – ||  (–) ||  (–) ||  ||  || 69–62 || Angel Stadium of Anaheim || || bgcolor="ffbbbb" | -5
|- bgcolor="#ffbbbb"
| 132 || August 28 || @ Mariners || – ||  (–) ||  (–) ||  ||  || 69–63 || Safeco Field || || bgcolor="ffbbbb" | -6
|- bgcolor="#ffbbbb"
| 133 || August 29 || @ Mariners || – ||  (–) ||  (–) ||  ||  || 69–64 || Safeco Field || || bgcolor="ffbbbb" | -7
|- bgcolor="#bbffbb"
| 134 || August 30 || @ Mariners || – ||  (–) ||  (–) ||  ||  || 70–64 || Safeco Field || || bgcolor="ffbbbb" | -7
|-

! Stadium
! width="50px" | Boxscore
! width="42px" | GB
|- bgcolor="#ffbbbb"
| 135 || September 1 || @ Tigers || – ||  (–) ||  (–) ||  ||  || 70–65 || Comerica Park || || bgcolor="ffbbbb" | -8
|- bgcolor="#bbffbb"
| 136 || September 2 || @ Tigers || – ||  (–) ||  (–) ||  ||  || 71–65 || Comerica Park || || bgcolor="ffbbbb" | -7
|- bgcolor="#bbffbb"
| 137 || September 3 || @ Tigers || – ||  (–) ||  (–) ||  ||  || 72–65 || Comerica Park || || bgcolor="ffbbbb" | -7
|- bgcolor="#bbffbb"
| 138 || September 4 || Orioles || – ||  (–) ||  (–) ||  ||  || 73–65 || Angel Stadium of Anaheim || || bgcolor="ffbbbb" | -6
|- bgcolor="#bbffbb"
| 139 || September 5 || Orioles || – ||  (–) ||  (–) ||  ||  || 74–65 || Angel Stadium of Anaheim || || bgcolor="ffbbbb" | -5
|- bgcolor="#bbffbb"
| 140 || September 6 || Orioles || – ||  (–) ||  (–) ||  ||  || 75–65 || Angel Stadium of Anaheim || || bgcolor="ffbbbb" | -5
|- bgcolor="#bbffbb"
| 141 || September 8 || Blue Jays || – ||  (–) ||  (–) ||  ||  || 76–65 || Angel Stadium of Anaheim || || bgcolor="ffbbbb" | -5
|- bgcolor="#ffbbbb"
| 142 || September 9 || Blue Jays || – ||  (–) ||  (–) ||  ||  || 76–66 || Angel Stadium of Anaheim || || bgcolor="ffbbbb" | -5
|- bgcolor="#bbffbb"
| 143 || September 10 || Blue Jays || – ||  (–) ||  (–) ||  ||  || 77–66 || Angel Stadium of Anaheim || || bgcolor="ffbbbb" | -5
|- bgcolor="#ffbbbb"
| 144 || September 11 || White Sox || – ||  (–) ||  (–) ||  ||  || 77–67 || Angel Stadium of Anaheim || || bgcolor="ffbbbb" | -5
|- bgcolor="#bbffbb"
| 145 || September 12 || White Sox || – ||  (–) ||  (–) ||  ||  || 78–67 || Angel Stadium of Anaheim || || bgcolor="ffbbbb" | -5
|- bgcolor="#ffbbbb"
| 146 || September 13 || White Sox || – ||  (–) ||  (–) ||  ||  || 78–68 || Angel Stadium of Anaheim || || bgcolor="ffbbbb" | -5
|- bgcolor="#bbffbb"
| 147 || September 14 || @ Rangers || – ||  (–) ||  (–) ||  ||  || 79–68 || Ameriquest Field in Arlington || || bgcolor="ffbbbb" | -5
|- bgcolor="#bbffbb"
| 148 || September 15 || @ Rangers || – ||  (–) ||  (–) ||  ||  || 80–68 || Ameriquest Field in Arlington || || bgcolor="ffbbbb" | -5
|- bgcolor="#ffbbbb"
| 149 || September 16 || @ Rangers || – ||  (–) ||  (–) ||  ||  || 80–69 || Ameriquest Field in Arlington || || bgcolor="ffbbbb" | -6
|- bgcolor="#ffbbbb"
| 150 || September 17 || @ Rangers || – ||  (–) ||  (–) ||  ||  || 80–70 || Ameriquest Field in Arlington || || bgcolor="ffbbbb" | -7
|- bgcolor="#bbffbb"
| 151 || September 19 || @ Royals || – ||  (–) ||  (–) ||  ||  || 81–70 || Kauffman Stadium || || bgcolor="ffbbbb" | -6
|- bgcolor="#bbffbb"
| 152 || September 20 || @ Royals || – ||  (–) ||  (–) ||  ||  || 82–70 || Kauffman Stadium || || bgcolor="ffbbbb" | -6
|- bgcolor="#ffbbbb"
| 153 || September 22 || @ Athletics || – ||  (–) ||  (–) ||  ||  || 82–71 || McAfee Coliseum || || bgcolor="ffbbbb" | -8
|- bgcolor="#bbffbb"
| 154 || September 23 || @ Athletics || – ||  (–) ||  (–) ||  ||  || 83–71 || McAfee Coliseum || || bgcolor="ffbbbb" | -7
|- bgcolor="#bbffbb"
| 155 || September 24 || @ Athletics || – ||  (–) ||  (–) ||  ||  || 84–71 || McAfee Coliseum || || bgcolor="ffbbbb" | -6
|- bgcolor="#bbffbb"
| 156 || September 25 || Rangers || – ||  (–) ||  (–) ||  ||  || 85–71 || Angel Stadium of Anaheim || || bgcolor="ffbbbb" | -5
|- bgcolor="#ffbbbb"
| 157 || E-September 26 || Rangers || – ||  (–) ||  (–) ||  ||  || 85–72 || Angel Stadium of Anaheim || || bgcolor="ffbbbb" | -6
|- bgcolor="#bbffbb"
| 158 || September 27 || Rangers || – ||  (–) ||  (–) ||  ||  || 86–72 || Angel Stadium of Anaheim || || bgcolor="ffbbbb" | -6
|- bgcolor="#bbffbb"
| 159 || September 28 || Athletics || – ||  (–) ||  (–) ||  ||  || 87–72 || Angel Stadium of Anaheim || || bgcolor="ffbbbb" | -5
|- bgcolor="#bbffbb"
| 160 || September 29 || Athletics || – ||  (–) ||  (–) ||  ||  || 88–72 || Angel Stadium of Anaheim || || bgcolor="ffbbbb" | -4
|- bgcolor="#bbffbb"
| 161 || September 30 || Athletics || – ||  (–) ||  (–) ||  ||  || 89–72 || Angel Stadium of Anaheim || || bgcolor="ffbbbb" | -3
|-

! Stadium
! width="50px" | Boxscore
! width="42px" | GB
|- bgcolor="ffbbbb"
| 162 || October 1 || Athletics || – ||  (–) ||  (–) ||  ||  || 89–73 || Angel Stadium of Anaheim || || bgcolor="ffbbbb" | -4

Player stats

Batting

Starters by position
Note: Pos = Position; G = Games played; AB = At bats; H = Hits; Avg. = Batting average; HR = Home runs; RBI = Runs batted in

Other batters
Note: G = Games played; AB = At bats; H = Hits; Avg. = Batting average; HR = Home runs; RBI = Runs batted in

Pitching

Starting and other pitchers 
Note: G = Games pitched; IP = Innings pitched; W = Wins; L = Losses; ERA = Earned run average; SO = Strikeouts

Relief pitchers 
Note: G = Games pitched; W = Wins; L = Losses; SV = Saves; ERA = Earned run average; SO = Strikeouts

Farm system

See also

Los Angeles Angels of Anaheim
Angel Stadium of Anaheim
2006 MLB season

Other Anaheim-based teams in 2006
Mighty Ducks of Anaheim/Anaheim Ducks (Arrowhead Pond/Honda Center)
 2005–06 Mighty Ducks of Anaheim season
2006–07 Anaheim Ducks season

References

Game logs:
1st half: Los Angeles Angels of Anaheim game log on ESPN.com
2nd half: Los Angeles Angels of Anaheim game log on ESPN.com
Batting statistics: Los Angeles Angels of Anaheim batting stats on ESPN.com
Pitching statistics: Los Angeles Angels of Anaheim pitching stats on ESPN.com

2006 Los Angeles Angels of Anaheim at Baseball Reference
2006 Los Angeles Angels of Anaheim team page at www.baseball-almanac.com

Los Angeles Angels seasons
Los Angeles Angels of Anaheim season
Los